Nadir Sarıbacak (born 14 September 1977) is a Turkish actor.

Career
Sarıbacak has appeared in many films produced in Turkey, while also working in television, the theatre, and advertising. In 2015, for his work in Tolga Karaçelik's  Ivy, he won the award for Best Actor in the 49th International Antalya Film Festival. In his acceptance speech, Sarıbacak expressed "solidarity with all [the] brothers and sisters in the making of the film," irrespective of nationality, in what was perceived by the television broadcasting channel as an indirect criticism of government policies, so his speech was censored. In 2016, he graduated from the "Advanced Acting Master Program" of Bahçeşehir University.

Selected filmography

References

External links 

1977 births
Living people
Turkish male film actors
People from Ankara